Sri Venkateswara Swami Vaari Temple is a Hindu temple situated in the hill town of Tirumala at Tirupati in Tirupati district of Andhra Pradesh, India. The Temple is dedicated to Venkateswara, a form of Vishnu, who is believed to have appeared on the earth to save mankind from trials and troubles of Kali Yuga. Hence the place has also got the name Kaliyuga Vaikuntha and the deity here is referred to as Kaliyuga Prathyaksha Daivam. The temple is also known by other names like Tirumala Temple, Tirupati Temple and Tirupati Balaji Temple. Venkateswara is known by many other names: Balaji, Govinda, and Srinivasa. The temple is run by Tirumala Tirupati Devasthanams (TTD), which is under control of Andhra Pradesh Government. The head of TTD is appointed by Andhra Pradesh Government. 

Tirumala Hills are part of Seshachalam Hills range. The temple lies on the seventh peak—Venkatadri, on the southern banks of Sri Swami Pushkarini, a holy water tank. Hence the temple is also referred to as "Temple of Seven Hills".

The Temple is constructed in South Indian architecture and is believed to be constructed over a period of time starting from 300 CE. The Garbhagruha (Sanctum Sanctorum) is called Ananda Nilayam. The presiding deity, Venkateswara, is in standing posture and faces east in Garbha Gruha. The temple follows Vaikhanasa Agama tradition of worship. The temple is one of the eight Vishnu Swayambhu Kshetras and is listed as the 75th Divya Desam. The Temple premises have two modern Queue complex buildings to manage the pilgrim crowd, Tarigonda Vengamamba Annaprasadam complex for free meals to Pilgrims, hair tonsure buildings and a number of pilgrim lodging sites.

It is one of the richest temples in the world in terms of donations received and wealth.

There are several legends associated with the manifestation of the deity in Tirumala. According to one legend, the temple has a murti of Venkateswara, it is believed, which shall remain here for the entire duration of the present Kali Yuga.

Temple legend

During Dvapara Yuga, Adisesha resided on earth as Seshachalam Hills after losing a contest with Vayu. According to Puranas, Tirumala is regarded as Adivaraha Kshetra. After killing Hiranyaksha, Adivaraha resided on this hill. Venkatachala Mahatyam is the widely accepted legend over Tirumala Temple.

During Kali Yuga, Narada advised some sages who were performing yagna to decide who could be given the fruits of yagna among Trimurtis (Brahma, Vishnu and Shiva). Bhrigu was sent to test the Trinity. The sage who had an extra eye in the sole of his foot visited Brahma and Shiva and went unnoticed in both these locations. He cursed Brahma to be not worshipped and Shiva to be worshipped as a lingam. At last he visited Vishnu and the lord acts as if he had not noticed Bhrigu. Getting angered by this act, sage Bhrigu kicked Vishnu in the chest, to which Vishnu did not react and instead apologised to the Sage by massaging his feet. During this act, he squashed the extra eye that was present in the sole of Bhrigu's foot. However Lakshmi finds it as an insult since Vishnu's chest was considered as Lakshmi's residence (vakshasthala) and Bhrigu kicked it which indirectly insulted Lakshmi. She then left Vaikuntha and came to Earth to Kolhapur and started meditating.

Vishnu bore human form as Srinivasa, left Vaikuntha, in search of Lakshmi, reached the Seshachalam hills in Tirumala and started meditating. Lakshmi learned of the condition of Srinivasa and called Shiva and Brahma. Shiva and Brahma then converted themselves into Cow and Calf and Lakshmi had handed over the cow and calf to Chola king ruling over Tirumala Hills at that time. The Cow would provide milk to Srinivasa daily while it was taken for grazing. One day, a cowherd saw this and tried to beat the Cow with his staff but Srinivasa had borne the injury. Getting angered by this Srinivasa had cursed the Chola king to become a Demon as dharma says sins committed by servants (shudras) should be borne by Kings. The king prayed for mercy after which Srinivasa said to him, that the King should take next birth as Akasharaja and should perform marriage of his daughter Padmavati with Srinivasa.

Srinivasa went to his foster-mother Vakula Devi on Tirumala hills and stayed there for a while. After curse, Chola king took rebirth as Akasharaja and he had a daughter named Padmavati, who was born in the Padmapushkarini situated at present day Tiruchanur in Andhra Pradesh. Srinivasa married Padmavati at present day Narayanavanam in Andhra Pradesh and returned to Tirumala Hills. After few months, Goddess Lakshmi had discovered the marriage of Srinivasa with Padamavati and went to Tirumala hills to question Srinivasa. Srinivasa, unable to bear the quarrel between Lakshmi and Padmavati, turned into stone right when he was encountered by Lakshmi and Padmavathi. Brahma and Shiva appeared before the confused queens and explain the main purpose behind all this - The Lord's desire to be on the seven hills for the emancipation of mankind from the perpetual troubles of Kali Yuga. Goddesses Lakshmi and Padmavathi also turn into stone deities expressing their wish to be always there. Lakshmi stays with Him on His Chest on the left side while Padmavathi rests on His Chest's right side.

History of the temple

Medieval history
The first recorded endowment was made by Pallava queen Samavai in the year 966 CE. She donated many jewels and two parcels of land (one 10 acres and other 13 acres) and ordered to use the revenues generated from that land for the celebration of major festivals in the temple. The Pallava dynasty (9th century), the Chola dynasty (10th century), and Vijayanagara pradhans (14th and 15th centuries) were committed devotees of Venkateswara. The temple gained most of its current wealth and size under the Vijayanagara Empire, present-day Karnataka state, with the donation of diamonds and gold. In 16th century, Vijayanagara Emperor Krishnadevaraya was a frequent donor and visitor to the temple. His donations of gold and jewels enabled the Ananda Nilayam (inner shrine) roofing to be gilded. On 2 January 1517, Krishnadevaraya installed his own statue in the temple. 

After the decline of Vijayanagara Empire, rulers from states such as the Kingdom of Mysore and the Gadwal Samsthanam worshipped as pilgrims and donated ornaments and valuables to the temple. Maratha general Raghoji I Bhonsle (died 1755) visited the temple and set up a permanent administration for the conduct of worship in the temple. Between 1320 CE and 1369 CE, idols of Ranganathaswamy Temple, Srirangam were brought to this temple for safe keeping.

Ramanujacharya's visits
In the 11th and 12th centuries, Ramanujacharya visited Tirupati thrice. On the first occasion, he spent a year with his uncle, Tirumalai Nambi, learning the esoteric meaning of Ramayana. His second visit was for settling a dispute that arose between the Saivites and Vaishnavites regarding the nature of the image set up in the Tirumala temple. During the last visit, which was at an advanced old age of 102 years, the acharya installed the image of Govindaraja and laid the foundations of the present town of Tirupati. Ramanuja streamlined the rituals at Tirumala temple according to Vaikanasa Agama tradition and introduced the recitation of Naalayira Divya Prabandham. He also set up Tirupati Jeeyar Mutt in 1119 AD in consultation with Tirumalai Ananthalwan to institutionalize service to the deity and supervise the temple rituals. The Jeeyars to this day ensures that the rituals ordained by Ramanuja are observed.

Modern history

After the end of Vijayanagara Empire, the temple went into the hands of Golconda in July 1656 and then it was under the French for a short period of time and under Nawab of Carnatic till 1801 CE. With the advent of British during the early 19th century, the management of the temple passed to hands of East India Company, who accorded special status to temple and avoided interference in temple activities. Madras government passed Regulation seven of 1817, which passed the temple to Board of Revenue through collector of North Arcot District. In 1821, Mr. Bruce, the then East India company commissioner for Chittoor district, had drawn rules for the management of Temple which is referred to as Bruce's Code.
The 7th Nizam of Hyderabad, Mir Osman Ali Khan donated 8,000 to the temple.

In 1843, the East India Company transferred the Administration of Temple along with other Temples in Tirupati to Mahants of Hathiramji Muth, who acted as Vicaranakartas. It was under the rule of Mahants for six generations until 1933 when Tirumala Tirupati Devasthanams was formed as a result of the TTD Act in 1933. The Act of 1933 was superseded by Madras Hindu Religious and Charitable Endowment Act of 1951. Again in 1966, the temple was placed under direct control of Andhra pradesh State Endowments Department, with Andhra Pradesh Charitable and Hindu Religious Institutions and Endowments act. In 1979, act of 1966 was rolled back with new Tirumala Tirupati Devasthanams act, where temple administration was vested to a committee consisting of Executive officer, Chairman and two other members nominated by Government of Andhra Pradesh.
The temple is run by body Tirumala Tirupati Devasthanams (TTD) which is under control of Andhra Pradesh Government. The head of TTD is appointed by Andhra Pradesh Government. The revenue from this shrine is used by Andhra Pradesh government.

The temple bears as many as 640 inscriptions in Kannada, Sanskrit, Tamil, Telugu languages. There is a unique collection of about 3000 copper plates on which the Telugu Sankirtanas of Tallapaka Annamacharya and his descendants are inscribed. This collection forms a valuable source of material for a historical linguist in Telugu apart from its importance to musicologists.

Temple administration

Tirumala Tirupati Devasthanams (TTD) is the trust board which oversees and manages the operations of Tirumala Venkateswara Temple. It is operated by a Board of Trustees that has increased in size from five (1951) to eighteen (2015) through the adoption of Acts. The daily operation and management of TTD is the responsibility of an executive officer, who is appointed by the Government of Andhra Pradesh.

The temple attracts approximately 75,000 pilgrims every day. The annual budget, estimated at INR 2530.10 crores for the financial year 2015–16, runs charitable trusts whose funds are derived from the budget and donations from the devotees. The annual income is estimated at INR 10 billion in 2008. Most of its income is derived from the donations in SriVari Hundi. Devotees donate to the TTD, which runs into millions of rupees. TTD, the organisation running the welfare of the temple, runs various charitable trusts, whose funds are derived from the budget and donations from the devotees.

Architecture

Dwarams and Prakarams
There are three Dwarams (entrances) which lead to Garbhagriha from outside. Mahadwaram, also known as padikavali, is the first entrance which is provided through Mahaprakaram (outer compound wall). A 50 feet, five storied Gopuram (Temple tower) is constructed over this Mahadwaram with seven Kalasams at its apex. Vendivakili (Silver Entrance), also known as Nadimipadikavali, is the second entrance and is provided through SampangiPrakaram (Inner compound wall). A three storied Gopuram is constructed over Vendivakili with seven Kalasams at its apex. Bangaruvakili (Golden Entrance) is the third entrance which leads into Garbhagriha. There are two tall copper images of the Dvarapalakas Jaya-Vijaya on either side of this door. The thick wooden door is covered with gold gilt plates depicting the Dasavathaaram of Vishnu.

Pradakshinams
Circumambulation around Sanctum sanctorum in the temple or deities is called Pradakshinam. There are two circumbulation paths in the temple. The first one is area between Mahaprakaram and sampangiprakaram. This path known as Sampangipradakshinam has many Mandapas, Dwajasthambam, Balipeetam, Kshetrapalika sila, prasadam distribution area etc. The Vimanapradakhinam is the second pradakshinam, which circumbulates Ananda Nilayam Vimanam. This path has sub-shrines dedicted to Varadaraja and Yoga Narasimha, Potu (main kitchen), Bangaru Bavi (golden well), Ankurarpana Mandapam, Yagasala, Nanala (coins and Notla (Paper notes) Parkamani, Almyrah of Sandal paste (Chandanapu ara), cell of records, Sannidhi Bhashyakarulu, Lords's hundi and the seat of Vishvaksena.

Anandanilayam vimanam and Garbhagriha
Garbhagriha is the Sanctum sanctorum where the presiding deity Venkateswara resides along with other small deities. Golden Entrance leads to Garbhagriha. There are two more doors in between Bangaruvakili and Garbhagriha. The deity is in a standing posture with four hands in different postures - one in varada posture, one placed over thigh and other two holding Shanka and Sudarshana Chakra. The deity is decorated with precious ornaments. The deity bears Goddess Lakshmi on the right chest and Goddess Padmavathi on the left. Pilgrims are not allowed to enter the Garbhagriha (beyond Kulasekharapadi (path).

Ananda Nilayam Vimanam is the main Gopuram constructed over Garbhagriha. This is a three storied Gopuram and has single Kalasam at its apex. It is covered with gilt copper plates and covered with a golden vase. There are many deities of gods carved over this Gopuram. On this Gopuram, there is a deity of Venkateswara known as Vimana Venkateswara which is believed to be exact replica of deity inside Garbhagriha.

Deities in the temple

Venkateswara, an avatar of Vishnu is the presiding deity of the temple. It is believed that the Moolavirat is Swayambhu (self manifested).

Pancha berams
As per Vaikhanasa Agamas, Venkateswara is represented by five deities (berams) including the Moolavirat which are together referred to as Pancha beramulu (Pancha means five; Beram means Deity). The five deities are Dhruva Beram (Moolavar), Kautuka Beram, Snapana Beram, Utsava Beram, Bali Beram. All the pancha berams are placed in the Garbha griha under Ananda Nilayam Vimanam.

Moolavirat or Dhruva Beram- In the centre of Garbha griha, under the Ananda Nilayam Vimana, the Moolavirat of Venkateswara is seen in standing posture on lotus base, with four arms, two holding Shanka and Chakra and one in Varada posture and other in Kati posture. This deity is considered the main source of energy for the temple and adorns with the Vaishnavite nama and jewels including vajra kiritam (diamond crown), Makarakundalas, Nagabharana, Makara Kanti, Saligrama haram, Lakshmi haram. Venkateswara's consort, Lakshmi stays on the chest of the Moolavirat as Vyuha Lakshmi.
Bhoga Srinivasa or Kautuka Beram -- This is a small one-foot (0.3 m) silver deity which was given to the temple in 614 AD by the Pallava Queen Samavai for conducting festivals. Bhoga Srinivasa is always placed near the left foot of Moolavirat and is always connected to the main deity by a holy Sambandha Kroocha.This deity receives many daily sevas(pleasures) on behalf of Moolavar and hence known as Bhoga Srinivasa(Telugu: Bhoga means Pleasure). This deity receives Ekanthaseva daily and SahasraKalasabhisheka on Wednesdays.
Ugra Srinivasa or Snapana Beram - This deity represents the fearsome (Telugu: Ugra means angry) aspect of deity Venkateswara. This deity was the main processional deity until 1330 CE when it was replaced by the Malayappa Swami deity. Ugra Srinivasa remains inside the sanctum sanctorum and comes out on a procession only one day in a year: on Kaishika Dwadasi, before the sunrise. This deity receives daily abhishekam on behalf of Moolavirat, giving the name Snapana Beram(Sanskrit: Snapana means cleansing)
Malayappa Swami or Utsava Beram - Malayappa is the processional deity (Utsava beram) of the Temple and is always flanked by the deities of his consorts Sridevi and Bhudevi. This deity receives all festivals like Brahmotsavams, Kalyanotsavam, Dolotsavam, Vasanthotsavam, Sahasra deepalankarana seva, Padmavati parinyotsavams, pushpapallaki, Anivara asthanam, Ugadi asthanam etc.
Koluvu Srinivasa or Bali Beram- Koluvu Srinivasa represents Bali Beram. Koluvu Srinivasa is regarded as the guardian deity of the temple that presides over its financial and economic affairs. Daily Koluvu seva(Telugu: Koluvu means engaged in) is held in the morning, during which, the previous day's offerings, income, expenditures are notified to this deity, with a presentation of accounts. Panchanga sravanam also is held at the same time during which that particular days Tithi, sunrise and sunset time, nakshatra are notified to the Venkateswara.

Other Murtis
Along with Pancha berams, the garbha griha also hosts the panchaloha deities of Sita, Rama, Lakshmana, Rukmini, Krishna, Chakratalvar. The temple hosts the deities of Garuda (Vishnu's vehicle), Narasimha, Varadaraja, Kubera, Hanuman in their respective sub-shrines. The temple also host the deities of Shesha (Vishnu's serpent), Viswaksena, Sugriva, Ramanuja. Vimana Venkateswara is the exact replica icon of Venkateswara carved on the Ananda Nilayam Viamana's second tier north west corner.

Worship

Puja
The temple follows Vaikhanasa Agama tradition of worship, which is believed to be revealed by Sage Vikhanasa and is propagated by his disciples Atri, Bhrigu, Marichi, Kasyapa. Vaikhanasa is one of the principal traditions of Hinduism and primarily worships Vishnu (and his associated Avatars) as the Supreme God. This ancient texts recommends six times a day puja (worship) for Vishnu, of which minimum one puja is mandatory. Rituals are classified as daily, weekly and periodical. The daily sevas in Temple (in order of occurrence) include Suprabhata Seva, Thomala Seva, Archana, Kalyanotsavam, Dolotsavam (Unjal Seva), Arjita Brahmotsavam, Arjita Vasantotsavam, Sahasra Dipalankarana Seva, Ekanta Seva. Weekly sevas of the Temple include Vishesha Pooja on Monday, Ashtadala Pada Padmaradhana on Tuesday, Sahasra Kalasabhishekam on Wednesday, Tiruppavada Seva on Thursday, Abhishekam and Nijapada Darshanam on Friday. There are no weekly sevas on Saturday and Sunday. Periodical rituals include Jyesthabhishekam, Aaniwara Asthanam, Pavithrotsavam, Koil Alwar Tirumanjanam.

Naivedhyam

The Tirupati Laddu is given at Tirumala Temple as prasadam. Tirupati Laddu had got Geographical indication tag which entitles only Tirumala Tirupati Devasthanams to make or sell it. Many other prasadams are also offered to Venkateswara and they are classified as Anna-prasadams and Panyarams. Annaprasadams include chakerapongal (sweet), Pulihora (tamarind rice), miryala pongal, kadambham, daddojanam (curd rice). Panyarams include laddu, vada, Dosa, Appam, jilebi, muruku, poli, payasam. Free meals are given daily to the pilgrims. On Thursdays, the Tiruppavada seva is conducted, where huge quantity of pulihora is offered to Venkateswara by heaping up into a pyramidal shape in Tirummani mandapam (ghanta mandapam).

Darshan
To manage the huge number of Devotees visiting the temple, Tirumala Tirupati Devasthanam constructed two Vaikuntam Queue Complexes: one in the year 1983 and the other in the year 2000. Vaikuntam Queue complexes have rooms where Devotees can sit and wait until their turn for Darshan. According to tradition, it is important for a devotee to have darshan of Bhuvaraha swamy temple lying on the northern banks of Swami Pushkarini before having Darshan of Venkateswara in the main temple.

Recently, the administration introduced a separate queue for pedestrian pilgrims. Free but limited number of biometric tokens are issued for the pilgrims to access this special queue. Tokens are provided on a first-come, first-served basis. The pilgrims can worship Venkateswara on the allotted time slots issued in the token. There are two entry points for the foot-path pilgrims: Alipiri Mettu and Srivari Mettu. Alipiri Mettu is open round the clock, whereas Srivari Mettu is open from 6am - 6pm.

Hair tonsuring
Many devotees have their head tonsured as "Mokku", an offering to God. The daily amount of hair collected is over a ton. The hair is collected and is sold internationally creating a substantial profit for the temple. As per legend, when Venkateswara was hit on his head by a cowherd, a small portion of his scalp became bald. This was noticed by Neela Devi, a Gandharva princess. Immediately, she cut a portion of her hair and, with her magic, implanted it on his scalp. Venkateswara noticed her sacrifice. As hair is a beautiful asset of the female form, he promised her that all his devotees who come to his abode would offer their hair to him, and she would be the recipient of all the hair received. Hence, it is believed that hair offered by the devotees is accepted by Neela Devi. The hill, Neeladri, one of the seven hills, is named after her. Traditionally the barbers employed to do the tonsuring were male and from the Nayee caste and this caused some discrimination and failed to resolve the requests from women that they would like a female barber. A protest led by Kagganapalli Radha Devi overturned the objections and temple agreed to appoint women barbers. Devi was recognised by Andhra Pradesh in 2017 and with an award of the Nari Shakti Puraskar by the President of India in 2019.

Hundi (donation pot)
 In remembrance of this, devotees go to Tirupati to donate money in Venkateswara's hundi (donation pot) so that he can pay it back to Kubera. The hundi collections go as high as 22.5 million INR a day.

Thulabaram
In the Thulabaram ritual, a devotee sits on a pan of a weighing balance and the other pan is filled with materials greater than the weight of the devotee. Devotees usually offer sugar, jaggery, tulsi leaves, banana, gold, coins. This is mostly performed with newborn babies or children.

Festivals

In the Venkateswara Temple over 433 festivals are being observed in 365 days of a year suiting the title "Nitya Kalyanam Paccha Toranam" where every day is a festival.

Sri Venkateswara Brahmotsavams, a nine-day event, which is celebrated every year during month of October, is the major event of Venkateswara Temple. During brahmotsavams the processional deity Malayappa along with his consorts SriDevi and BhuDevi, is taken in a procession in four mada streets around the temple on different vahanams. Vahanams include Dwajarohanam, Pedda Sesha Vahanam, Chinna Sesha Vahanam, Hamsa Vahanam, Simha Vahanam, Muthaypu pandiri Vahanam, Kalpavriksha Vahanam, Sarva Bhoopala Vahanam, Mohini Avataram, Garuda Vahanam, Hanumantha Vahanam, Swarna Rathotsavam (Golden Chariot), Gajavahanam, Rathotsavam (Chariot), Ashwa Vahanam, and Chakra Snanam. During Brahmotsavams, the temple will witness lakhs of devotees particularly on Garuda vahanam. Vaikunta Ekadasi, the day on which it is believed that Vaikunta Dwarams will be opened and the most important Vasihnavite festival, is celebrated with grandeur in Tirumala. The Tirumala Venkateswara Temple will be flooded with devotees on a single day with numbers reaching up to 150,000, to have a darshan of Venkateswara through special entrance which encircles inner sanctum called "Vaikunta Dwaram". Rathasapthami is another festival, celebrated during February, when Venkateswara's processional deity (Malayappa) is taken in a procession around the temple on seven different vahanams starting from early morning to late night. The other annual festivals include Rama Navami, Janmashtami, Ugadi, Teppotsavam (Float Festival), Sri Padmavati Parinayotsavams, Pushpa yagam, Pushpa pallaki, Vasanthotsavam (spring festival) conducted in March–April, were celebrated with great splendor.

Songs and hymns
 Venkateswara Suprabhatam is the first and pre-dawn seva performed to Venkateswara at Sayana Mandapam inside sanctum sanctorum of Tirumala Temple. 'Suprabhatam' is a Sanskrit term which literally means 'Good Morning' and is meant to wake up the deity from His celestial sleep. Venkateswara Suprabhatam hymns were composed by Prathivadhi Bhayankaram Annangaracharya during 13th century and consists of 70 slokas in four parts including Suprabhatam(29), Stotram(11), Prapatti(14) and Mangalasasanam(16). The thirteenth sloka of Venkateswara Suprabhatam is as follows:
Devanagari
श्रीमन्नभीष्ट-वरदाखिललोक-बन्धो 
श्रीश्रीनिवास-जगदेकदयैकसिन्धो । 
श्रीदेवतागृहभुजान्तर-दिव्यमूर्ते 
श्रीवेङ्कटाचलपते तव सुप्रभातम् ॥ 

Telugu script
శ్రీమన్నాభీష్ట -వరదఖిలలోక -బంధో  
శ్రీ శ్రీనివాస-జగదేకదయైకసింధో | 
శ్రీదేవతాగృహభుజాన్తర-దివ్యమూర్తే 
శ్రీవెంకటాచలపతే  తవ సుప్రభాతం|| 

IAST
śrīmannabhīṣṭavaradākhilalokabandho 
śrīśrīnivāsajagadekadayaikasindho । 
śrīdevatāgṛhabhujāntaradivyamūrte 
śrīveṅkaṭācalapate tava suprabhātam ॥ 
Tallapaka Annamacharya (Annamayya), the poet saint of 14th century, one of the greatest Telugu poets and a great devotee of Venkateswara, had sung 32000 songs in praise of Venkateswara. All his songs which are in Telugu and Sanskrit, are referred to as Sankirtanas and are classified as Sringara Sankirtanalu and Adhyatma Sankirtanalu.

The Seven Hills
The temple is located on seven hills. The presiding deity is also referred to as Sapthagirisha or Lord of Seven hills. It is believed that seven hills, also referred to as Saptagiri, represent the seven hoods of Adisesha. The seven hills are as follows:

Vrushabhadri—Hill of Vrishabasura, who was killed by Srinivasa
Anjanadri—Hill of Hanuman.
Neeladri—Hill of Neela Devi
Garudadri or Garudachalam—Hill of Garuda, the vahana of Vishnu
Seshadri or Seshachalam—Hill of Sesha, the dasa of Vishnu
Narayanadri—Hill of Narayana. Srivari Padalu (footprints of Venkateswara) are located here
Venkatadri—Hill of Venkateswara

Subshrines

Varadaraja Temple

There is a small shrine dedicated to Varadaraja located in Vimana-pradakshinam, towards left of Vendivakili (silver entrance) while entering temple. It is not known when this deity was installed. The stone deity is sitting posture facing west.

Yoga Narasimha Temple

A shrine is dedicated to Narasimha in North-east corner of the Vimana-Pradakshina.  The Yoga-Narasimha is seen sitting in cross-legged posture bound by yoga patta and holding Shankha and chakra in upper two hands and two lower hands in yoga mudra.

Garuthmantha Temple

A small shrine dedicated to Garuda the vehicle of Venkateswara is situated exactly opposite to the Bangaruvakili (Golden Entrance) of Jaya-Vijaya. This sub-shrine is part of Garudamandapam. The Garuthmantha deity is six feet tall and faces west looking towards Venkateswara inside Garbhagriha.

Bhuvaraha Swamy Temple

Bhuvaraha Swamy Temple is the temple dedicated to Varaha an incarnation of Vishnu. This temple is believed to be older than Venkateswara Temple. The temple lies on the Northern Banks of Swami Pushkarini. As per tradition, at first Naivedyam will be offered to Bhuvaraha Swamy before offering it to Venkateswara in main Temple. And also as per tradition, devotees should have the darshan of Bhuvaraha swamy before Venkateswara.

Bedi-Anjaneya Temple

Bedi-Anjaneya Temple is the sub-shrine dedicated to Hanuman. The temple lies exactly opposite to the Mahadwaram near Akhilandam (place where coconuts are offered). The deity in this temple has both of his hands handcuffed (Telugu Language:Bedilu).

Vakulamatha Sannidhi

Vakulamatha is the mother of Venkateswara. There is statue dedicated to her in the main temple just ahead of Varadaraja shrine. The deity is in sitting posture. As per legend, she supervises the preparation of food that is to be offered to her son. For this reason a hole is made to the wall which separates Vakulamatha sannidhi and Srivari potu(Kitchen).

Kubera Sannidi

There is a sub-shrine dedicated to Kubera within the Vimanapradakshina. The deity lies to the right side of Garbhagriha and faces south towards preciding deity.

Ramanuja Shrine

The Shrine of Sri Ramanuja is located adjacent to the northern corridor of the Vimana Pradakshinam. It is also known as the Bhashyakara Sannidhi. The shrine was built around in the 13th century A.D.

Notable devotees

Ramanuja (1017–1137) the most important Acharya of Sri Vaishnavism. was responsible for managing the worshipping procedures and other affairs of the Venkateswara temple. He is credited for gifting the holy conch and the discus, the weapons of Vishnu during his visit. So he is considered as 'Acharya'(Guru or teacher) to the himself. He established the Pedda Jeeyar Matam. He has a sannidhi(shrine) inside the temple which was built by Sri AnanthALwAn.

Sri Tallapaka Annamacharya (or Annamayya) (22 May 1408 – 4 April 1503) was the official songmaster of the Tirumala Venkateswara Temple, and a Telugu composer who composed around 36000 keertanas, many of which were in praise of Venkateswara, the presiding deity of the temple.

Hathiram Bhavaji was a saint from Ayodhya who visited Tirumala around 1500 CE on a pilgrimage and became a devotee of Venkateswara.

Religious significance

The temple is considered one of the eight Swayambhu Kshetras of Vishnu where presiding deity is believed to have manifested on its own. Seven other temples in the line are Srirangam Ranganathaswamy temple, Bhu Varaha Swamy temple, and Vanamamalai Perumal Temple in South India and Saligrama in Nepal, Naimisaranya, Pushkar and Badrinath Temple in North India.

The temple is revered by Alvars in Divya Prabandham. The temple is classified as a Divyadesam, one of the 108 Vishnu temples that are mentioned in these books. The benefits acquired by a pilgrimage to Venkatachala are mentioned in the Rig Veda and Asthadasa Puranas. In these epics, Venkateswara is described as the great bestower of boons. There are several legends associated with the manifestation of the at Tirumala.

Nearby temples

There are many ancient temples nearby Tirumala. Sri Padamavathi Temple is temple dedicated to Padmavathi, the wife of Venkateswara, situated at Tiruchanur which is 5 km from Tirupati. Srikalahasteeswara Temple is the temple dedicated to Shiva which represents Vayu (air) form of elements of Nature, is situated at Srikalahasti which is 38 km from Tirupati. Sri Varasiddhi Vinayaka Temple, situated at Kanipakam town, is a 10th-century Temple dedicated to Vinayaka at 75 km from Tirupati. Other than these, temples like Govindaraja Temple, Kalyana Venkateswara Temple(Srinivasa Mangapuram), Kodandarama Temple, Kapila Theertham are situated within the Tirupati city.

See also
 Balaji Temple, Ketkawla
 Sri Lakshmi Narasimha Swamy Temple, Yadadri
 Bruce's Code
 Tirumala Tirupati Devasthanams

Notes

References

External links

 Veṅkaṭācala-māhātmya, Skanda Purana
 

3rd-century establishments
3rd-century establishments in India
Tirupati

Hindu pilgrimage sites in India
Tirumala Tirupati Devasthanams
Vaishnavism
Vishnu temples
Buildings and structures in Tirupati